Gowharan (also Romanized as Gowharān and Gūharān; also known as Angahran, Angohrān (Persian: انگهران), Angūran (Persian: انگوران), and Qal‘eh-ye Angūrān) is a city in Gowharan Rural District, Gowharan District, Bashagard County, Hormozgan Province, Iran. At the 2006 census, its population was 828, in 199 families.

References 

Populated places in Bashagard County
Cities in Hormozgan Province